Baroness Therese von Lützow (born 4 July 1804 in Stuttgart; died 16 September 1852 in Tjilatjap, Java) was a German noblewoman and an author.

Early life 
Born as daughter of Heinrich Christian Gottfried von Struve (1772-1851), member of the Struve family and his wife, Countess Sophie Elisabeth Wilhelmine Oexle von Friedenberg (1780–1837).

Biography 
She moved to Hamburg, and finally to Saint Petersburg, where her father served as an ambassador. Therese married firstly Robert Gabriel von Bacheracht (1798-1884). Later she divorced him and married Baron Heinrich von Lützow (1807-1879). Therese accompanied her second husband, to Java, where she died.

Works
Her chief publication is the correspondence between Wilhelm von Humboldt and her friend Charlotte Diede, under the title Briefe an eine Freundin von Wilhehn von Humboldt (1847; 12th ed. 1891). Her other works include society novels, such as Lydia (1884) and Weltglück (1885), and several volumes of travel.

References

 

1804 births
1852 deaths
German women novelists
Writers from Stuttgart
19th-century German novelists
19th-century German women writers